Abacetus crenulatus is a species of ground beetle in the subfamily Pterostichinae. It was described by the French entomologist Pierre François Marie Auguste Dejean in 1831. It is one of a number of predacious soil surface-dwelling beetles in West African rice ecosystems, detected in insect surveys in rice paddies in Cameroon looking for beetles that can help reduce pest numbers in field crops.

References

crenulatus
Beetles described in 1831